Arthur Eric Clarke (3 December 1921 – 4 July 2014) was a British Fullbore Rifle shooter.  He represented Scotland in the Commonwealth Games in 1982, 1986 and 1990, winning Gold in the Fullbore Rifle Queens Prize in the 1982 Commonwealth Games.

Arthur won the Bisley Grand Aggregate on two occasions (1979, 1980) and came second twice (1968, 1985).  In 1971, he founded a gunsmith shop in Camberley (A.E.Clarke & Co). In 1983, he was a prime mover behind instigating the annual Intercounties Competition held at Bisley Ranges to encourage team shooting.

References

External links
The Telegraph: Obituary

Scottish male sport shooters
British male sport shooters
Commonwealth Games gold medallists for Scotland
Shooters at the 1982 Commonwealth Games
Shooters at the 1986 Commonwealth Games
Shooters at the 1990 Commonwealth Games
1921 births
2014 deaths
Commonwealth Games medallists in shooting
Medallists at the 1982 Commonwealth Games